Funeral is the thirteenth studio album by American rapper Lil Wayne. It was released on January 31, 2020, by Young Money Entertainment and Republic Records. It features guest appearances by Big Sean, Lil Baby, Jay Rock, Adam Levine, 2 Chainz, Takeoff, The-Dream, Lil Twist, the late XXXTentacion and O.T. Genasis. On May 29, the deluxe edition of the album was released with guests appearances from Doja Cat, Tory Lanez, Lil Uzi Vert, Benny the Butcher, Conway the Machine, and Jessie Reyez.

"I Do It" featuring Big Sean and Lil Baby was released as a single the same day as the album.
"Shimmy" featuring Doja Cat was sent to rhythmic contemporary radio on July 28, 2020, as the album's second single.

The album debuted at number one on the US Billboard 200, while charting moderately in other territories. It was relatively overlooked by professional review outlets, although several critics were somewhat positive in appraising the album.

Recording and production
In 2016, while Lil Wayne was in the midst of the legal battle with Cash Money Records over contractual disputes, it was announced that his next album would be titled Funeral. The album was completed in 2019, as Wayne started promoting the album again. In an interview with Vibe, Lil Wayne spoke on how his recording process changed throughout his career, saying:

The track "Bing James" concludes with 24 seconds of silence, paying tribute to the death of Kobe Bryant. The album also contains 24 tracks on the standard edition and 8 tracks on the deluxe edition, honoring Kobe Bryant's jersey numbers with the Los Angeles Lakers.

Marketing and sales
In an interview leading up to the album's release, Lil Wayne explained the title Funeral as a continuation of his album Rebirth in 2010, to follow-up on the series. The calligraphic text on the cover features a rotational ambigram. It reads Funeral right side up and Lil Wayne upside down. On January 23, 2020, Lil Wayne revealed the album's release date and artwork. With the announcement, he also teased a snippet of the album's title track. 

Funeral debuted atop the US Billboard 200 for the week of February 15, 2020, recording 139,000 album-equivalent units, 38,000 of which were pure album sales. It is Lil Wayne's fifth US number-one album.

Critical reception

Funeral was met with a positive response from critics. At Metacritic, which assigns a normalized rating out of 100 to reviews from professional publications, the album received an average score of 62, based on 10 reviews. Aggregator AnyDecentMusic? gave it 5.9 out of 10, based on their assessment of the critical consensus. According to Robert Christgau, the album was "downplayed by most of the few outlets that bothered to review it at all—five mostly kindish notices are nonetheless stuck down in Metacritic’s dread 50-60 zone, with only Rolling Stones a takedown pan."

Reviewing in February 2020 for Consequence of Sound, Christopher Thiessen said that "Funeral plays less like an album and more like a mixtape" and wrote of Lil Wayne: "He still has endless punchlines to punctuate his effortless flow. He still has clear vision and awareness of his place in the hip-hop game. However, Wayne is not a great editor, and thus listening to Funeral can become exhausting about halfway through." Jacob Carey of Exclaim! also criticized the length of the album and concluded that, "overall, Funeral lacks replay value compared to the multiple 'best of the year' albums that Wayne has proven capable of creating." NMEs Thomas Hobbs felt that the songs lack a unifying quality within the context of an album, while interpreting the large number of tracks as "an attempt to play into streaming politics". He added that, "it's a real shame that the ambitious druggy swirl of some of the earlier material is replaced with more formulaic songwriting". Danny Schwartz wrote in Rolling Stone: "Funeral is wildly uneven, a landscape of pronounced highs and lows. In truth, it peaks early, on 'Mahogany'." Schwartz called "Trust Nobody" the worst song on the album, labeling it a "sunk by a banal and out-of-place Adam Levine hook, while noting that "Get Out Of My Head" is "soured by the great rap pedant XXXTentacion" and called "Sights and Silencers" a "surprisingly limp The-Dream ballad that he should have just given to Jeremih". While applauding the parental neglect-themed "Bastard (Satan's Kid)", he ultimately found Funeral to be "emotionally adrift".

Other reviewers were more enthusiastic. In The Observer, Kitty Empire wrote that Lil Wayne's "flow can still be fearsome, even if his edit function remains iffy", and that songs such as "Clap for Em" are more than lively enough to render the album's title "nonsense". Pitchfork's Sheldon Pearce credited him for "experimenting with an array of styles and a dizzying maze of wordplay", while comparing his raps to thrilling romps: "Wayne raps with a lightning ferocity that will often conceal his more direct revelations." Similarly, RapReviews critic Ryan Feyre said that "Wayne, much like in his mixtape days, is finally having fun again. And when he does that, the results are captivating." In his Substack-published "Consumer Guide" column, Christgau regarded the album as the rapper's best since No Ceilings (2010) and explained: "Cherishing no vested interest in hip-hop's musical progress, if any, I enjoy the shit out of it while admitting it's more a collection than an album, its parts more impressive than what they add up to. But it had me from the superb lead/title track: 'Welcome to the funeral/Closed casket as usual/Soul snatching, that’s usual/Amen, hallelujah though/Whole family delusional/Niggas cryin’ like two-year-olds.'"

Track listingNotes  signifies a co-producer
  signifies an additional producer
  signifies an uncredited co-producer
 "Dreams" features additional vocals by Ben Burgess
 "Get Outta My Head" samples "The Boy With The Black Eyes" by XXXTENTACIONSample credits "Mahogany" contains samples from "Bass Song", written and performed by Eryn Kane.
 "Clap for Em" contains samples from "Drag Rap (Triggerman)", written by Orville Hall and Phillip Price, as performed by The Showboys.
"Harden" contains samples from "Love Me or Leave Me", written by Donald Breedlove, Herb Pilhofer and Napoleon Crayton, as performed by Band of Thieves. Found and cleared through Tracklib.

PersonnelMusicians Jonathan Buice – string arranger , keyboards 
 Memru Renjaan – guitar , electric bass Technical'
 Matthew Testa – engineering 
 Manny Galvez – engineering 
 Jeff Edwards – engineering 
 Mailbox – engineering 
 EJ – engineering 
 Chef – engineering 
 Steven McDowell – engineering 
 Jason Delattiboudere – recording assistant , remix engineering assistant 
 Patrick Kehrier – recording assistant 
 Eddie Taylor – recording assistant 
 Raymond Auzenne – recording arranger 
 Fabian Marasciullo – mixing 
 Thomas McLaren – mixing assistant 
 Morgan David – mixing assistant 
 Robert Soukiasyan – additional mixing

Charts

Weekly charts

Year-end charts

References

External links 
 

2020 albums
Albums produced by Cool & Dre
Albums produced by Jahlil Beats
Albums produced by Mannie Fresh
Albums produced by Mike Will Made It
Albums produced by Murda Beatz
Lil Wayne albums
Republic Records albums
Young Money Entertainment albums